Fujimaki (written: 藤巻 or 藤牧) is a Japanese surname. Notable people with the surname include:

, Japanese voice actress
, Japanese footballer
, Japanese fencer
, Japanese manga artist

See also
Fujioka Fujimaki, a Japanese folk band

Japanese-language surnames